Frédéric Pajak (born 1955) is a French illustrator and writer. He was born in Hauts-de-Seine. He is the first author to win the Prix Médicis Essai for non-fiction with a graphic work.

He pioneered the genre of the graphic essay with L'immense solitude (Presses universitaires de France, 1999), a work which won the Prix Michel Dentan in Switzerland. He has published more than 20 books, including the annual series Manifeste incertain (Les Éditions Noir sur Blanc), which he began in 2012. The work is a melange of autobiography, essay and poetry, and won Pajak the Prix Médicis.

He is also a filmmaker, and the creator of such works as En souvenir du monde, Aubrun, l'absolue peinture and L'Art du dessin.

References

External links
 

1955 births
20th-century French illustrators
20th-century French male writers
Prix Médicis essai winners
French writers
Living people
People from Hauts-de-Seine